The Systems Integration Evaluation Remote Research Aircraft (SIERRA) is a UAV designed by the U.S. Naval Research Laboratory and developed at NASA's Ames Research Center.

Specifications

See also
 Unmanned Aerial Vehicle

External links
 NASA Aircraft Catalog: SIERRA

Unmanned aerial vehicles of the United States